The Billboard Hot 100 is a chart that ranks the best-performing singles of the United States. Its data, published by Billboard magazine and compiled by Nielsen SoundScan, is based collectively on each single's weekly physical and digital sales, as well as airplay and streaming. In 2013, a total of 11 singles claimed the top spot in 52 issues of the magazine. One of which, "Locked Out of Heaven" by singer Bruno Mars started its peak position in late 2012.

Throughout 2013, eight acts achieved their first US number-one single, either as a lead artist or a featured guest: Macklemore & Ryan Lewis, Wanz, Baauer, Ray Dalton, Robin Thicke, Miley Cyrus and Lorde. Nate Ruess, already having hit number one with Fun, earns his first number one song as a solo act. Five collaboration singles topped the chart. Macklemore & Ryan Lewis' debut single "Thrift Shop" featuring Wanz became the best-performing single of 2013, peaking atop the chart for six weeks, also topping the Billboard Year-End Hot 100. The duo's second hit "Can't Hold Us" also reached the chart's top spot, making the duo the first act to score number-one singles on the Hot 100 with their first two charting songs since Lady Gaga with her hits "Just Dance" and "Poker Face" in 2009. Baauer scored his first number-one hit with "Harlem Shake". Originally, it was released commercially in June 2012, yet it did not sell significantly until February due to viral videos on YouTube and later created a meme with the same name.

Macklemore & Ryan Lewis were the only act to have more than one number one song, with two.

"When I Was Your Man" was Bruno Mars' fifth single to top the chart. With the achievement, Mars became the fastest male artist to gain five number-one singles since Elvis Presley. It was also the second hit only featuring piano and vocals to peak atop the Hot 100 chart since Adele's "Someone like You" (2011). Singer Lorde's song "Royals" made her the youngest solo artist to achieve a number-one single in the US since Tiffany's "I Think We're Alone Now" (1988). "The Monster" by Eminem featuring Rihanna became the former's fifth number-one single in the country, tying him with P. Diddy and Ludacris as the rappers with the most number-one songs on the chart. Meanwhile, it also made Rihanna the artist with the third-most US number-one singles (13), alongside Michael Jackson.

"Blurred Lines" by Robin Thicke featuring T.I. and Pharrell was the longest-running single of the year at the top spot, peaking at number one for twelve consecutive weeks. With the combined chart run throughout June, July and August, "Blurred Lines" became Billboards Song of the Summer 2013. Lorde's "Royals" became the second longest-running number-one single, claiming the top spot for a total of nine weeks. "Locked Out of Heaven" by Bruno Mars and "Thrift Shop" by Macklemore & Ryan Lewis featuring Wanz both spent six weeks atop the Hot 100.

Chart history

Number-one artists

See also
2013 in American music
List of Billboard 200 number-one albums of 2013
List of Billboard Hot 100 top 10 singles in 2013

Notes

References

External links

United States Hot 100
2013
Hot 100 number-one singles